Nancy van der Burg (born 18 May 1992) is a Dutch racing cyclist, who currently rides for UCI Women's Continental Team .

Career
She rode for Restore–Reppel–SK Bouw from 2011 to 2016, before switching to Jos Feron Lady Force for 2017. During 2017 she won stage three of the Tour de Feminin-O cenu Českého Švýcarska, in which she eventually finished in ninth in the points classification, and was second on stage one of the Tour Cycliste Féminin International de l'Ardèche. She returned to the Jos Feron Lady Force team for 2019, and finished fourth at Draai rond de Kraai, and later sixth at the Dutch National Road Race Championships.

References

External links

1992 births
Living people
Dutch female cyclists
People from Pijnacker-Nootdorp
Cyclists from South Holland
20th-century Dutch women
21st-century Dutch women